WindSingers is a Hungarian a cappella group singing mostly jazz, its own pop arrangements and the compositions of Kayamar who is also the bass singer of the group.

Founding

In 2011 Dóra Vers (mezzo), Veronika Földi (alto) and Márton Nagy-György (tenor) founded the group in the jazz faculty of the Béla Bartók Conservatory of Music. They started to cooperate with the singer-composer Viktor Magyaróvári (Kayamar), whom they knew from the classical faculty of the Conservatory. Kayamar's bass-line (many articles count him as one of the lowest basses on earth) and his arrangements highly determine the image of the group.

Recent activity

The WindSingers went through many changes during the years but the goal to perform pop and jazz songs on the highest level stayed. They became one of the most successful a cappella group in Hungary and in the last years they had many concerts in Austria, Slovakia, Serbia and Romania too. The WindSingers became a regular guest at the Budapest Jazz Club which is one of the most prestigious jazz stages in Hungary. In the summer of 2013 and 2014 the group won one-one silver diploma during the vokal.total a cappella competition in Pop and Jazz categories. In the summer of 2015 their first album was released called "The Morning Comes".

Sources

Musical groups established in 2011
Hungarian jazz ensembles
Vocalese singers
Vocal quintets
Professional a cappella groups
Vocal jazz ensembles
2011 establishments in Hungary